Ronald Howard may refer to:
Ron Howard (born 1954), American actor and director
Ronald Howard (British actor) (1918–1996), British actor
Ronald A. Howard (born 1934), Stanford professor
Ron Howard (American football) (born 1951), American football player
Ron Howard (Australian footballer) (born 1940), Australian footballer for Footscray
Ron Howard (basketball) (born 1982), American professional basketball player
Ronald Ray Howard (1973–2005), American murderer executed by lethal injection